Scott Ferguson is an American television and film producer. He is currently an executive producer of the HBO series Succession.

Biography 
Ferguson received his B.A. from Cornell University and MFA from Columbia University. He began his career with producer Michael Hausman. He was unit manager of The Firm (1993) and associate producer of films on Nobody’s Fool (1994), A Family Thing (1996), Twilight (2008), The People vs. Larry Flynt (1996) and Man on the Moon (1999), and an assistant director on Eternal Sunshine of the Spotless Mind (2004).

Ferguson was nominated for eight Emmy Awards and won three, including the 2010 Primetime Emmy Award for Outstanding Television Movie for producing Temple Grandin (2010), 2014 Primetime Emmy Award for Outstanding Television Movie for producing The Normal Heart (2014), and 2020 Primetime Emmy Award for Outstanding Drama Series as executive producer of Succession (2018–).

Ferguson also received four Directors Guild of America Awards for his work on Brokeback Mountain (2005), Recount (2008), Temple Grandin (2010) and Succession (2018–). He earned six Producers Guild Film Award nominations, earning three awards for his work on The Normal Heart (2014) and Succession (2018–).

Ferguson received Peabody Awards in 2011 and 2019 for his work on Temple Grandin (2010) and Succession (2018–).

References 

Living people
Year of birth missing (living people)
Cornell University alumni
Columbia University School of the Arts alumni
Peabody Award winners
Directors Guild of America Award winners
American television producers
American film producers
Primetime Emmy Award winners